Hugh Catchpole CBE HI (26 May 1907 – 1 February 1997) was a British educationist and philanthropist, mostly active in British India, and later India and Pakistan. He was a teacher and administrator in military colleges and schools such as Prince of Wales Royal Indian Military College, Pakistan Air Force School in Sargodha and Abbottabad Public School. He was the founder principal of Cadet College at Hasan Abdal. For 5 years of his life, he was in the Royal Army and for over 60 years, he was associated with schools in India and Pakistan.

Background 
Hugh Catchpole was born in Ipswich, Suffolk, England on 26 May 1907. One of five siblings, his father Henry Catchpole was the head of a building firm in Suffolk. He studied in Ipswich School during his early years and played cricket for Suffolk County XI. Later he studied Modern History at the University of Oxford with a scholarship, which he completed in 1928. He also studied Indian history during his stay in Oxford, which formed his interest to come to British India for a teaching assignment at Prince of Wales Royal Indian Military College (Rashtriya Indian Military College) in Dehradun, India as a teacher in 1928.

He joined the Royal Army in 1941 and was in the army until September 1946. In the military he attained the rank of Captain and taught Urdu to British cadets and in the United Kingdom he interrogated Indian soldiers who had been captured by the German army but managed to escape. He later served a second stint in army from December 1946 to October 1948.

Students 
His students include highly ranked officers in the Indian defence forces, the Pakistani defence forces and the Bangladeshi defence forces. These include officers such as Air Marshal Asghar Khan and Air Marshal Nur Khan.

Awards and honours 
 1 January 1971 – Officer of the Most Excellent Order of the British Empire (OBE), conferred by Elizabeth II
 31 December 1980 – Commander of the Most Excellent Order of the British Empire (CBE), conferred by Elizabeth II
 23 March 1979 – Sitara-e-Imtiaz (Star of Excellence) Award by the President of Pakistan.
 15 June 2007 – Hilal-i-Imtiaz (Crescent of Excellence) Award, second highest civil award of Pakistan, conferred by General Pervez Musharraf posthumously.

Hugh Catchpole Memorial English Debate 
The All India Hugh Catchpole Memorial English Debate is an interschool debate competition in India started by Rashtriya Indian Military College (RIMC) in 2006 and is named after Hugh Catchpole. The debate is conducted on a modified Cambridge pattern. Up to 20 reputed institutions from India participate in this event, and the winners over the years have been schools such as Wynberg Allen School in 2009, La Martiniere (Lucknow) in 2013, St. Joseph's Academy (Dehradun) in 2015 and RIMC in 2012 and 2016.

See also 
 The Frank Anthony Memorial All-India Inter-School Debate

Bibliography 
 Bikram Singh, Sidharth Mishra (1997). Where Gallantry is Tradition: Saga of Rashtriya Indian Military College. Allied Publishers Limited

References

External links 
 Founder Principal, Cadet College Hasan Abdal - Archived
 Life of Hugh Catchpole
 RIMC founder remembered
 Mr Hugh Catchpole's Notes on English Grammar and Uses

Officers of the Order of the British Empire
Recipients of Hilal-i-Imtiaz
Recipients of Sitara-i-Imtiaz
Commanders of the Order of the British Empire
Heads of schools in India
Heads of schools in Pakistan
1907 births
People educated at Ipswich School
Alumni of the University of Oxford
1997 deaths
British expatriates in Pakistan
British people in colonial India